The Canadian Association of Industrial Mechanical and Allied Workers (CAIMAW) was an independent trade union in Canada. Formed in Winnipeg, Manitoba in 1964, it was a breakaway from the International Molders and Foundry Workers Union of North America. In 1971, the union joined the left-wing Council of Canadian Unions, which became the Confederation of Canadian Unions in 1973. CAIMAW was part of the larger trend of unionization in Canada which emphasized independence from the United States-dominated international union movement as well as increased organizational democracy. In 1991, it had a membership of approximately 6,500, which voted 82% in favour of merging into the newly independent Canadian Auto Workers.

References

1964 establishments in Manitoba
Trade unions established in 1964
Confederation of Canadian Unions
Canadian Auto Workers
Breakaway trade unions